Topolje is a settlement in the region of Baranja, Croatia. Administratively, it is located in the Draž municipality within the Osijek-Baranja County. Its population is 473 people.

References

Populated places in Osijek-Baranja County
Baranya (region)